Mike Gibbons (born April 9, 1955) is an American ice hockey coach. After 40+ years in coaching, Mike Gibbons retired after the 2020 season with the St. Cloud State Huskies men's ice hockey team. Following the COVID-shortened 20–21 season, Gibbons returned to his alma mater as an assistant for the first time in 38 years.

Career
Gibbons is a graduate of Bemidji State University, where he was played for the Beavers men's hockey team from 1975 to 1979.  He gained All-America notice in 1978 and 1979 and was a member of the national title-winning team in 1979.  He started his coaching career at Bemidji State as an assistant in 1981. Gibbons then served as the BSU head coach during the 1982-83 season, while previous head coach Bob Peters took a year-long sabbatical. During this time he was named the NHCA Conference Coach of the Year and the College Division National Coach of the Year.

Gibbons moved to Northern Michigan University in 1983, and served as an assistant coach with the Wildcats’ hockey program until 1988. He went on to serve as an assistant coach at Colorado College (1988 to 1990) and the University of Denver (1990 to 1994). In 1993, he was a co-coach with Scott Owens for the USA Select Team. After leaving Denver, Gibbons worked for one year as the head coach for the Langley Thunder in the BCJHL.

From 1995 to 1997, Gibbons was an assistant coach with the Baltimore Bandits, the Anaheim Ducks’ American Hockey League affiliate. While at Baltimore, Gibbons coached NHL Stanley Cup winner Matt Cullen. Incidentally, Cullen played collegiate hockey at St. Cloud State, where Gibbons has coached since 2007.

After this time, Gibbons returned to Minnesota to become head coach of the boys' hockey program at Eastview High School, which had opened in the summer of 1997.  During ten seasons at Eastview, Gibbons earned Minnesota State High School League Section 5 Coach of the Year honors in 2001, 2003 and 2004.

In 2006, Gibbons served as an assistant coach to Northern Michigan Wildcats men's hockey coach Walt Kyle for the USA Junior National Team, placing fourth at the World Junior Tournament in Vancouver, B.C.

In the summer of 2007, Gibbons was hired as an assistant for the St. Cloud State men's hockey team, where he recruited future NHL players Oliver Lauridson, Ben Hanowski, Nick Jensen, and Nick Dowd, and helped coach St. Cloud to NCAA tournament berths in 2008, 2010, 2012, 2013, 2014, 2015, 2016, 2018, and 2019. While at St. Cloud State, the American Hockey Coaches Association named Gibbons the recipient of the 2016 Terry Flanagan Award, which recognizes career achievement as an assistant hockey coach.

Personal life
Gibbons is a native of White Bear Lake, Minnesota and a graduate of Hill-Murray School. He obtained his Bachelor's degree in Business as well as his Master's degree in Education from Bemidji State University. He and his wife Nancy reside in St. Cloud, Minnesota and have three children, Sean, Kelly, and Shannon.  His grandfather,  middleweight boxer Mike Gibbons, is regarded as one of the best boxers of all time, while his grandfather's brother Tommy Gibbons was also a renowned heavyweight boxer.

Awards
1979 NAIA All American
1983 Edward Jeremiah Award (Division III Coach of the Year)
2016 Terry Flanagan Award (Division I Assistant Coach of the Year)

Coaching record

High School

Amateur

Professional

Collegiate

References

External links

1955 births
American men's ice hockey defensemen
Ice hockey coaches from Minnesota
Living people
People from White Bear Lake, Minnesota
Ice hockey players from Minnesota